Glendon Andrews (born 11 February 1945) is an English former professional footballer who played as a right back and forward in the Football League for Bradford (Park Avenue).

References

1945 births
Living people
Sportspeople from Dudley
English footballers
Manchester United F.C. players
Wolverhampton Wanderers F.C. players
Bradford (Park Avenue) A.F.C. players
Chelmsford City F.C. players
English Football League players
Association football forwards
Association football fullbacks